Shahid Motahari University (Persian: دانشگاه شهید مطهری) was built in 1879 by Mirza Hosein Sepahsalar (Persian: میرزا حسین سهپسالار). The university is located in Baharestan square in Tehran, Iran.

After the revolution in 1979, Ayatollah Emami-Kashani was appointed as the president of the university. Since then, the university has mostly focused on religious studies and social sciences. It is particularly well-known for its graduate programs in Philosophy, Law, and Islamic Jurisprudence. Admission to the university is only possible through the annual Konkoor.

Some of the notable alumni include Ebrahim Raisi, the current President of Iran, Mahdi Khamooshi, Massoud Khamenei, Mohammad Javad Hajaliakbari, a number of other Iranian officials.

References

External links
Official Website of the University

Shahid Motahari University
Islamic schools
Seminaries and theological colleges in Iran